Jack Arnold is the name of:
Jack Arnold (director) (1916–1992), American film and television director
Jack Arnold (rugby league) (born c. 1920), Australian rugby league player
Jack Arnold (1906–1970), name used by American actor Vinton Hayworth
Jack Arnold, the name of Dan Lauria's character on The Wonder Years

See also
John Arnold (disambiguation)